Florence is a neighborhood in Omaha, Nebraska, United States on the city's north end and originally one of the oldest cities in Nebraska.  It was incorporated by the Nebraska Territorial Legislature on March 10, 1857. The site of Winter Quarters for Mormon migrants traveling west, it has the oldest cemetery for people of European descent and oldest standing gristmill in Nebraska. Florence was the site of an illegal territorial legislature in 1858. Given the high concentration of National Register of Historic Places in the neighborhood, it is regarded as "the historic front door to Omaha as well as the state."

History
In the spring of 1854 James C. Mitchell, following the advice of the fur trader Peter A. Sarpy, platted the village of Florence, including the old buildings and improvements of old Cutler's Park. Cutler's Park was established at the site of the Church of Jesus Christ of Latter-day Saints 1846 Winter Quarters as a hold-over on their way from Nauvoo, Illinois to Utah. Due to the harsh conditions, 359 members of the 2,500 person party died and are buried in what is now called the Mormon Pioneer Cemetery. Their community was the first city in the Nebraska Territory. Despite lasting only two years, the city had a mayor and city council, 24 policemen and fireguards, various administrative committees, and a town square for public meetings. The Mormon pioneers left their town once they moved on in 1848. Mitchell platted Florence six years later. The town of Florence was named for one Miss Florence Kilbourn.

Late in 1854 the town of Florence made a bid to become the Nebraska State Capitol, which it lost to Omaha.  The Bank of Florence, now listed on the National Register of Historic Places, was built as a wildcat bank in 1856. It fell in the Panic of 1857, leaving thousands of local townspeople and area farmers severely financially drained.

Florence Legislature
In January, 1858 a group of representatives illegally moved the Nebraska Territorial Legislature to Florence following a violent outburst at the Territorial Capitol in Omaha. After repeatedly being dogged out of voting on the removal of the Capitol from Omaha, a skirmish pitted representatives from Nebraska City, Florence, and other communities to convene outside of Omaha. Despite having a majority of members present for the vote to remove the Capitol and all agreeing, the "Florence Legislature" did not succeed in swaying the Nebraska Territory governor, and the Capitol remained in Omaha until 1867 when Nebraska gained statehood.

Omaha annexation
In 1917, the town was annexed by the City of Omaha. The Fort Omaha Balloon School was established later that year as the first such military school in America.

Historic landmarks

Interesting sites
In addition to these historic landmarks designated by the city, state or federal government, a new attraction is the Winter Quarters Nebraska Temple, constructed in 2001. The opening ceremonies and open house for the large temple drew thousands of visitors. The Mormon Trail Center in Florence is a museum interpreting the Mormon Trail and early Mormon-era history of the area.

Also of interest are the Mormon Pioneer Memorial Bridge, built in 1952; it carries Interstate 680 over the Missouri River. The Mormon Bridge Tollhouse, at 3010 Willit Street, was related to the operations of the toll bridge.

See also
History of North Omaha, Nebraska
Timeline of North Omaha, Nebraska history
Landmarks in North Omaha, Nebraska

References

External links
Historical Florence website
 1856 drawing of the steamer Omaha landing Mormon settlers at Florence.

Former municipalities in Nebraska
History of North Omaha, Nebraska
Neighborhoods in Omaha, Nebraska
Landmarks in Nebraska
Populated places established in 1854
Nebraska Territory
1854 establishments in Nebraska Territory